Theodoros II may refer to:

 Patriarch Theodore II of Alexandria (Coadjutor), Greek Patriarch of Alexandria between the 7th and 8th centuries
 Theodore II of Constantinople, Ecumenical Patriarch in 1214–1216
 Theodore II Laskaris, Emperor of Nicaea in 1254–1258
 Theodore II Palaiologos, Despot in Morea in 1407–1443
 Tewodros II, Emperor of Ethiopia from 1855 to 1868
 Patriarch Theodore II of Alexandria, Greek Patriarch of Alexandria since 2004
 Pope Tawadros II of Alexandria, ruled since 2012